Northwestern National Life Insurance Co. v. Riggs, 203 U.S. 243 (1906), was an important United States Supreme Court case dealing with corporations conducting business and the power of individual states to regulate how corporations may conduct business.

Facts
The conflict within the case involved the payment of a life insurance claim made by Riggs for the estate of Eber B. Roloson against Northwestern National Life Insurance Company, which Northwestern refused to pay saying that the deceased had made false statements concerning his medical history.  The state of Missouri had in place a series of legislative acts in the period of 1874 and 1889 that basically created a condition on any life insurance contract in which though medical history information may be inaccurate, if the inaccurate information had no bearing on the manner of the deceased's death then any claim must still be paid.  If the inaccurate information did bear on the manner of the deceased's death or if there was a dispute concerning whether the information provided bore on the manner of the deceased's death, then the matter was for a jury to decide whether the claim should be paid.

Trial
In a jury trial on a claim by Riggs for the estate of Roloson, Northwestern National requested that the jury be instructed that the Missouri statute "was not applicable to this case, and could not be applied to it consistently with the 14th Amendment of the Constitution of the United States".  The jury was not so instructed.  The trial resulted in a judgment against the defendant, Northwestern National Life Insurance Company.

Northwestern National appealed the judgment with the position the corporation's due process rights under the Fourteenth Amendment had been violated.

Previous Supreme Court decisions had said that liberty "guaranteed by the 14th Amendment against deprivation otherwise than by due process of law embraces the right to pursue a lawful calling and enter into all contracts proper, necessary, and essential to the carrying out of the purposes of such calling."  This interpretation of the Fourteenth Amendment had been applied to corporations and individuals.  The Court ruled that the Fourteenth Amendment was not a bar to many state laws that effectively limit a corporation's right to contract business so long as such limits were not unreasonable constraints on trade and due process for resolving conflicts and disputes existed.

Northwestern National's arguments were based on the fact that it was, as a corporation, an artificial "person" and hence subject to the protections afforded "persons" under that amendment, an argument which had been and was later used successfully to declare child labor and minimum wage laws unconstitutional.

Judgment
The Court ruled to uphold the application of the Missouri statute, saying:

See also
List of United States Supreme Court cases, volume 203
Corporate personhood
Allgeyer v. State of Louisiana (165 U.S. 578) [1897]
Lake Shore & M. S. R. Co. v. Ohio (173 U.S. 285, 297)
Powell v. Pennsylvania (127 U.S. 678, 684)
Adkins v. Children's Hospital (261 U.S. 525) Federal minimum wage for women unconstitutional infringement of contract
Muller v. Oregon (208 U.S. 412) upheld state restrictions on working hours of women
West Coast Hotel Co. v. Parrish (300 U.S. 379) upheld constitutionality of minimum wage

External links

United States Supreme Court cases
United States substantive due process case law
1906 in United States case law
United States Supreme Court cases of the Fuller Court